Cornelia Sabiti Kakooza, (née Cornelia Sabiiti), is a Ugandan lawyer and judge on the High Court of Uganda. She was appointed to that court by president Yoweri Museveni, on 8 February 2018.

Background and education
She graduated from the Faculty of Law of Makerere University, Uganda's largest and oldest public university, with a Bachelor of Laws. The following year, she was awarded a Diploma in Legal Practice by the Law Development Centre, in Kampala, Uganda's capital city. She also holds a Postgraduate Diploma in Procurement, obtained from the International Labour Organization, at its training facility in Turin, Italy.

Career
In her early years, Ms Sabiiti worked as a legal adviser to the 
Public Procurement and Disposal of Public Assets Authority (PPDA), for a period of seven years. She was then appointed as the Company Secretary and Director of Legal and Compliance at the PPDA. In March 2011, she was appointed to a six-year renewable term as the Executive Director to the government agency. While there, she spearheaded government procurement reforms, where in all government contracts, at least 30 percent of the work, or 30 percent of sourced supplies are reserved for local firms or suppliers. In 2017, Sabiiti opted not to renew her tenure at the PPDA, going back to her private practice instead.

In 2018, Cornelia Sabiiti was appointed to the High Court, and was assigned to the Land Division of that court.

See also
Monica Mugenyi
Joyce Kavuma
Lydia Mugambe
Ministry of Justice and Constitutional Affairs (Uganda)

References

External links
Museveni Appoints New Judges to The Court of Appeal As of 8 February 2018.
The Honorable Judges Of The High Court As of 27 March 2018.

21st-century Ugandan judges
20th-century Ugandan lawyers
1970s births
Living people
Ugandan women judges
Makerere University alumni
Law Development Centre alumni
People from Western Region, Uganda
Justices of the High Court of Uganda
21st-century women judges